HMS C34 was one of 38 C-class submarines built for the Royal Navy in the first decade of the 20th century. The boat was sunk by a German submarine in 1917.

Design and description
The C-class boats of the 1907–08 and subsequent Naval Programmes were modified to improve their speed, both above and below the surface. They displaced  on the surface and  submerged. The C-class submarines had a crew of two officers and fourteen ratings.

For surface running, the boats were powered by a single 12-cylinder  Vickers petrol engine that drove one propeller shaft. When submerged the propeller was driven by a  electric motor. They could reach  on the surface and  underwater.

The boats were armed with two 18-inch (45 cm) torpedo tubes in the bow. They could carry a pair of reload torpedoes, but generally did not as they would have to remove an equal weight of fuel in compensation.

Construction and career

HMS C34 was built by HM Dockyard, Chatham for the Royal Navy. She was laid down on 29 March 1909 and was commissioned on 17 September 1910. The only survivor was picked up by U-52.

Notes

References

External links
 HMS C34 Roll of Honour
 'Submarine losses 1904 to present day' - Royal Navy Submarine Museum

 

British C-class submarines
Royal Navy ship names
World War I shipwrecks in the North Sea
Ships sunk by German submarines in World War I
Lost submarines of the United Kingdom
Maritime incidents in 1917
1910 ships
Ships built in Chatham